

Releases

January

February

March

April

May

June

July

August

September

October

November

References 

2016
Nepalese
2016 in Nepal